David Portnoy (born March 22, 1977) is an American blogger and founder of the sports and popular culture blog Barstool Sports, which was acquired by Penn Entertainment.

Early life 
Portnoy grew up in Swampscott, Massachusetts. He is Jewish and had a Bar Mitzvah.

He attended Swampscott High School and one of his high school classmates was ESPN's Todd McShay, who, coincidentally, was born on the same day as Portnoy. He began attending the University of Michigan in 1995 and graduated with a degree in education. While at Michigan, Portnoy founded thegamblingman.com, a website where he published his sports betting picks.

Career 
After graduating from the University of Michigan in 1999, Portnoy moved to Boston and began working at Yankee Group, an IT market research firm.

Barstool Sports 
After four years, in 2003, Portnoy left the Yankee Group and founded Barstool Sports. The early iteration of Barstool was a four-page sports newspaper that Portnoy handed out on subway platforms and street corners in Boston. The paper was meant to appeal to young men and rejected political correctness. Early advertisers in the newspaper included offshore betting websites such as partypoker, which was operating in the United States illegally. The contents of the newspaper was originally solely written by Portnoy, but freelance writers, including Todd McShay, joined the paper. At first, the paper struggled, but gained traction in 2004 when Portnoy began placing photos of women in bikinis on the front page of the newspaper. In 2007, Barstool expanded to a blog.

Portnoy gradually cultivated his persona as "El Presidente", a blunt and candid character. His writing was well-received among young men and the publication subsequently became a mainstay of bro culture. He became known for his unapologetic and brash attitude and has faced criticism over blog posts and disparaging and offensive comments towards women and others. In 2010, Portnoy joked about women being raped saying "if you're a size 6 and you’re wearing skinny jeans you kind of deserve to be raped right?" In 2016, Portnoy used the word "nigger" in a Barstool video, for which he later apologized.

Peter Chernin's The Chernin Group purchased a majority stake of Barstool on January 7, 2016, and it was announced that the headquarters would move to New York City. In 2020, Penn Entertainment purchased a 36% stake in Barstool Sports for $163 million, including $135 million in cash and $28 million in Penn non-voting convertible preferred stock. Following the sale, The Chernin Group maintained a 36% stake in the company, while Portnoy continued to run the site and retains creative control over content. In February 2023, Penn acquired the remainder of Barstool Sports for $388 million.

Pizza reviews 
One Bite with Davey Pageviews is an internet show that Portnoy created, which consists of him reviewing pizza restaurants around the world. Portnoy began his goal of reviewing every pizza place in Manhattan in 2017. In addition to Portnoy, some reviews feature celebrity guests.

Labor investigation 
The National Labor Relations Board investigated Portnoy in 2019 for posts on Twitter on charges that he illegally threatened to fire his workers if they unionized. That December, Portnoy reached an informal settlement with the Board, which required him to delete his threatening tweets and remove any potential anti-union material created by Barstool Sports. The settlement also noted that the Twitter account originally encouraging employees to unionize was actually owned by Barstool in an attempt to out labor organizers.

Politics 
Portnoy identifies as "socially liberal" and "fiscally conservative." Portnoy opposed COVID-19 lockdowns saying "When did this become...'flatten the curve' to 'we have to find a cure or everyone's going to die?

In a 2015 blog post, Portnoy said "I am voting for Donald Trump. I don't care if he's a joke. I don't care if he's racist. I don't care if he's sexist. I don't care about any of it. I hope he stays in the race and I hope he wins. Why? Because I love the fact that he is making other politicians squirm. I love the fact he says shit nobody else will say, regardless of how ridiculous it is." However, in 2022, he said it is "dangerous" to vote for Republicans because they will appoint Justices who are too conservative to the Supreme Court. He stated he would vote for President Joe Biden if he runs against Trump in 2024.

Portnoy criticized the 2022 Dobbs v. Jackson decision by the Supreme Court, which overturned Roe v. Wade. Portnoy said: "To me, this is just pure insanity, pure insanity. We are going backwards in time. We are literally going backwards in time! It makes no sense how anybody thinks it’s their right to tell a woman what to do with her body."

2013 Boston mayoral campaign 
In 2013, Portnoy launched an unsuccessful campaign to become the mayor of Boston following the retirement of mayor Thomas Menino. During the race, Portnoy identified as a libertarian. After raising more than $17,000 in campaign contributions, he failed to submit enough nomination signatures to qualify for the ballot.

Personal life
Portnoy married Renee Satherthwaite in 2009, and in January 2017, Portnoy separated from his wife. Portnoy is dating model Silvana Mojica. In 2019, Portnoy said that his net worth was around $100 million.

In 2020, Portnoy donated $500,000 of his own money to The Barstool Fund, a relief effort for small business affected by the COVID-19 pandemic. Through May 2021, the campaign raised over $39 million for 348 businesses.

Controversies
In 2004, Portnoy filed for bankruptcy protection, following large gambling losses. He owed $59,000 to credit card companies and $18,000 to his father. In January 2020, a tax lien for $11,795 was filed against Portnoy by the U.S. Securities and Exchange Commission.

A sex tape of Portnoy was leaked in December 2019.

Arrests 
Portnoy has twice been detained in NFL-related incidents: first on May 12, 2015, when he was arrested by New York City police after he and three Barstool employees handcuffed one another on the floor of NFL headquarters to protest Deflategate, and again in 2019 when he was placed in a holding cell at Mercedes-Benz Stadium for a portion of Super Bowl LIII. In the latter incident, he had created fake passes to attend a press event the day prior and was prohibited from attending the game.

Sexual misconduct allegations 
In November 2021, a Business Insider exposé alleged that Portnoy had engaged in violent and aggressive sexual encounters with three young women and that he had filmed the women without their consent. He denied that the sex was nonconsensual. Portnoy called the article a "hit piece," claiming that Business Insider tried to find evidence of wrongdoing from him for approximately eight months.

In early February 2022, more sexual assault and harassment claims by young women were published in a second Business Insider article. After these new allegations were made, Portnoy announced a lawsuit against the publication. A federal judge dismissed the lawsuit in November 2022. Portnoy filed an appeal of the dismissal. In February 2023, he dropped his appeal.

References

External links
 
 

1977 births
21st-century American businesspeople
21st-century American Jews
American bloggers
American Internet company founders
American male bloggers
American restaurant critics
Barstool Sports people
Jewish American entertainers
Jewish American sportspeople
Living people
Massachusetts Libertarians
People from Swampscott, Massachusetts
Sportspeople from Essex County, Massachusetts
University of Michigan School of Education alumni
Video bloggers